The Tale of Genji Museum is in Uji, Kyoto, Japan. It displays the world of  the early 11th century Japanese classic novel The Tale of Genji with projected images, models, and exhibitions. The culture of the Imperial Court of the Heian period, the aristocrats' costumes, and the furnishings of their residences are shown.

The last ten chapters of The Tale of Genji are set in Uji; the hero is Kaoru Genji (a son of Hikaru Genji). The story of these chapters is reproduced with great realism using a scrim and life-size set. Visitors are introduced to the story line and main characters. A short film based on the "Uji chapters" and created solely for the museum is presented in the movie room.

There is a library with a collection of books about The Tale of Genji.

The museum opened in 1998.

Gallery

External links

The Tale of Genji Museum, Uji City

Museums in Kyoto Prefecture
Literary museums in Japan
Museums established in 1998
1998 establishments in Japan
The Tale of Genji
Uji, Kyoto